Randell Johnson (born March 23, 1991) is a former American football outside linebacker. He was drafted by the Buffalo Bills in the seventh round of the 2014 NFL Draft. He played college football at FAU.

High school
Johnson attended North Miami High School in Miami, Florida, where he recorded 99 tackles, including seven sacks and two interceptions as a senior, earning all-Dade-County honorable mention honors.

He was considered two-star recruit by Rivals.com.

College career
Johnson attended Florida Atlantic University, where he was a member of the FAU Owls football team from 2009 to 2013. During his career, he saw action in 42 games, amassing 195 total tackles, including 30.5 for loss, 10.5 sacks, four pass deflections and four forced fumbles.

Professional career

Buffalo Bills
He was drafted by the Buffalo Bills in the seventh round (221st overall) of the 2014 NFL Draft. On September 2, 2016, he was released by the Bills as part of final roster cuts.

Los Angeles Rams
On November 22, 2016, Johnson was signed to the Los Angeles Rams' practice squad.

New York Jets
On December 19, 2016, Johnson was signed by the New York Jets off the Rams' practice squad. He was waived by the Jets on June 9, 2017.

Orlando Apollos
Johnson signed with the Orlando Apollos of the Alliance of American Football for the 2019 season.  On January 14, 2019, Johnson retired from the Apollos.

References

External links
FAU Owls bio

1991 births
Living people
North Miami Senior High School alumni
Players of American football from Miami
American football linebackers
Florida Atlantic Owls football players
Buffalo Bills players
Los Angeles Rams players
New York Jets players
Orlando Apollos players